Cellana tramoserica is a species of marine gastropod mollusc (sea snail) in the family Nacellidae, one of the families of true limpets. 

This marine species is native to Australia. Individuals in this species can grow up to 65 mm in length.

References

 Nakano T. & Ozawa T. (2007). Worldwide phylogeography of limpets of the order Patellogastropoda: molecular, morphological and paleontological evidence. Journal of Molluscan Studies 73(1): 79–99

Gastropods of Australia
Nacellidae
Gastropods described in 1802